The ongoing COVID-19 pandemic was confirmed to have reached the French overseas department and region of Mayotte on 10 March 2020. On 31 March, the first person died of COVID-19. In late April, the virus was out of control, and actively circulating on the island. On 16 August, Mayotte has been green listed.

Background 
On 12 January 2020, the World Health Organization (WHO) confirmed that a novel coronavirus was the cause of a respiratory illness in a cluster of people in Wuhan City, Hubei Province, China, which was reported to the WHO on 31 December 2019.

The case fatality ratio for COVID-19 has been much lower than SARS of 2003, but the transmission has been significantly greater, with a significant total death toll.

Timeline

March 2020
 A man from the department of Oise, France, arrived in Mayotte on 10 March. He had suspicious flu-like symptoms, and was observed for three days in a hospital. On 13 March, the man tested positive for COVID-19.
 On 17 March, a third case, also a traveler, was identified. The island later entered lockdown, as was the case with metropolitan France. With a single hospital center for a population of 263,000 inhabitants and precarious living conditions (84% live below the poverty line), there is great concern. As in Réunion, the island is also affected by dengue fever.
 On 18 March, the authorities set up a health control system at Dzaoudzi airport, with volunteer school nurses.
 On 23 March, French National Assembly member Mansour Kamardine was very concerned and arranged 69 additional hospital beds to be shipped to Mayotte, because there were only 16 ICU beds.
 A curfew was instituted between 20:00 and 05:00. Gatherings with more than two people were banned. Traffic restrictions applied throughout the island.
 On 30 March, the bar of 50 cases was reached.
 On 31 March, Mayotte recorded its first death. By that date, 101 cases had been confirmed and ten patients had recovered, leaving 90 active cases.

April 2020
 On 1 April, the bar of 100 cases was exceeded.
 On 3 April, MP Mansour Kamardine was hospitalized and tested positive for COVID-19; he was infected locally.
 On 4 April, an air bridge was setup between Réunion and Mayotte to supply the island with sanitary and food products and if needed health workers.

 On 8 April, a second death related to COVID-19 is announced; just as in the first case, the person presented with aggravating pathologies. On 16 April, Dominique Voynet, Director of Mayotte Regional Health Agency, announced that a person from the Comoros who died on 8 April before being evacuated to Mayotte on the basis of a x-ray of was Said Toihir, the Grand Mufti of the Comoros. The announcement caused a diplomatic rift between Comoros and France. Mohamed El-Amine Souef, Foreign Minister of Comoros said "If a case is confirmed in the Comoros, it is not Dominique Voynet to announce it, we have been independent since 6 July 1975." On 30 April, Comoros announced its first case.
 On 10 April, the ARS announced 191 cases, including 41 health professionals; 17 people are hospitalized, including 4 in intensive care; 50 patients are recovered.
 The report of the Scientific Council on the Evolution of the Coronavirus in the Overseas Territories has been released which calls for strict confinement, doubling of hospital capacity. The situation in Mayotte is considered worrying and therefore calls for an "extra-hospital" structure to isolate the asymptomatic cases.
 On 11 April, a third death was declared; the number of cases increased slightly to 196.
 On 12 April, there were 203 confirmed cases. 67 people have recovered, and more than 1,400 tests have been performed thus far.
 On 13 April, there were 207 confirmed cases including 42 health workers.
 On 14 April, health care professionals from France have come to the aid of Mayotte. They have all been tested prior to boarding, and will not be quarantined on arrival, but have to abide by special precautionary rules.
 On 15 April, a group of students from Mayotte in France, have written open letter that they wished to be repatriated because they have been confined in a near empty dormitory for almost a month now. No plans for repatriation from France have been announced yet, however on 2 May the Delegation of Mayotte in Paris (DMP) will provide emergency aid to the student and other residents stranded in mainland France. The French government have announced a €200,- grant to all students under 25 stranded in France. The Union of Reunion Students of France has already expressed their disappointment.
 A positive case was discovered from Comoros where there are officially no COVID-19 infections. As a result, all nautical activities have been banned in order to better guard against illegal border crossings by boat.
 On 16 April, measures have been put in place for pregnant women, because up to date 10 tested positive. 1,600 tests have been performed.
 Jean-François Colombet, the Prefect of Mayotte, said that the current situation is a fight on multiple fronts where food aid is also a major issue. €2 million in food stamps are being distributed. Colombet also calls upon the food markets to remain open during Ramadan.
 On 17 April, the fourth death was announced. 1,700 tests have been performed up to now.
 On 18 April, it was announced that 108 people had died in March, an increase of 30% compared to 2019. 40% of the deaths are people over 75.
 On 20 April, Dominique Voynet announced that she considered postponing the deconfinement until after Ramadan. Mayotte is also facing an epidemic of dengue with more than 1,000 confirmed cases.
 On 21 April, the National Institute of Statistics and Economic Studies published a report on the living conditions of people of Mayotte under confinement. 30.4% of the population is living in 1 or 2 room houses with 4 more or people, and 81,000 people do not have access to water in their house, which makes effective isolation difficult.
 On 23 April, the Association of Mayotte Mayors consider that the conditions for reopening of schools on 11 May as announced by Macron are not met, and want more guarantees.
 On 24 April, Mahamoud Hamada Sanda, the Grand Qadi, has called on the population to pray and celebrate Ramadan individually and not to engage in communal meals. All 325 mosques are closed and will remain closed as long as necessary.
 On 25 April, it was announced that a private laboratory will also be doing testing. As of 25 April, more than 2,500 tests have been performed.
 As of 27 April, Mayotte is the most affected overseas territory, and now has 1,550 cases per million.
 The Armed Forces delivered 15 tons of food to Mayotte. The shipment consists of fresh fruit and vegetables, meat, eggs, sugar and chocolate but also hygienic products.
 On 28 April, there was no update on either the site of the Prefecture and on ARS. On 29 April, there was a statement by Dominique Voynet that there were 40 more cases on the 28th and 39 more cases on the 29th.
 On 29 April, stage 3 had been declared for Mayotte which means that the virus is now actively circulating the island. Deconfinement on 11 May is out of the question.
 On 30 April, Annick Girardin, Minister of Overseas France, has announced a doubling of the tests in Mayotte and the establishment of a field hospital. Most overseas territories either have little or no spread or have the epidemic under control. Mayotte however is a concern. Mayotte has tested over 3,000 people out of population of 262,895 (2017) up to now. The number of confirmed cases stood at 539 of which 300 were still active. Four COVID-19 deaths had been reported.

May 2020
 On 1 May, there was no official update of the number of cases, however it was announced that there were four more deaths bringing the total to 8. The number had been revised down to six on 2 May, because two people tested negative.
 On 4 May, it was announced that the imam of the Friday mosque in Mamoudzou, Sheikh Abdourahamane Ben Omar died of COVID-19. Ben Omar died in the night of Sunday to Monday.
 Prime Minister Edouard Philippe said that a decision about deconfinement for Mayotte will be postponed until 13 May.
 On 7 May, it was announced that Mayotte would the only department of France for which the lockdown will not be lifted four days later. Not only is the number of cases per capita (3,248/M) higher than the French average (2,053/M), the number of cases is increasing.
 On 8 May, Jacques Billant, Prefect of Réunion, confirmed that patients from Mayotte were transferred to Réunion. Two medical evacuation had been carried out recently.
 On 11 May, Overseas Minister Annick Girardin announced additional resources including a field hospital and 100 health workers. The current field hospital is already evolving into a city hospital. To alleviate the hospitals, cases were evacuated to Réunion.
 One of the new cases is a newborn baby infected by the mother. The hospital reported that there was no reason for concern.
 On 12 May, it was announced that one of the first patients in intensive care has recovered. His condition worsened, he was hospitalized, moved to intensive care, intubated, placed in an induced coma, but emerged from his coma and was able to breath again. He is currently recovering in Réunion and regaining strength.
 On 31 May, COVID-19 was discovered in the Majicavo prison. All inmates, guards, and staff have been tested. 107 have thus far tested positive. Another 45 tested positive on 1 June. By the end of May there had been 1871 confirmed cases and 23 fatalities.

June 2020
 In June there were 732 new cases, bringing the total number of confirmed cases to 2603. The death toll rose to 35. The number of recovered patients was 2324, leaving 244 active cases at the end of the month. 236 of the new cases could be linked to clusters inside the Majicavo prison.

July to September 2020
 There were 359 new cases in July, bringing the total number of confirmed cases to 2962. The death toll rose to 39. The number of recovered patients increased by 397 to 2721, leaving 202 active cases at the end of the month (17% less than at the end of June).
 As of 16 August 2020, Mayotte has been officially listed as green, i.e. the virus is considered under control. During the month there were 339 new cases, bringing the total number of confirmed cases to 3301. The death toll rose to 40. 47 of the new cases could be linked to a cluster in a municipality in northern Mayotte.
 There were 478 new cases in September, bringing the total number of confirmed cases to 3779. The death toll rose to 42.

October to December 2020
 There were 649 new cases in October, bringing the total number of confirmed cases to 4428. The death toll rose to 44. 52 of the new cases could be linked to a cluster at the Foreign Legion Detachment in Mayotte.
 There were 753 new cases in November, bringing the total number of confirmed cases to 5181. The death toll rose to 49.
 There were 709 new cases in December, bringing the total number of confirmed cases to 5890. The death toll rose to 55.

January to March 2021
 The first case of the 501.V2 variant was confirmed on 15 January. Mayotte's vaccination campaign started on 25 January. By the end of the month, 78 cases of 501.V2 had been identified. The first case of the B.1.1.7 variant was confirmed the last week of January. There were 2341 new cases in January, bringing the total number of confirmed cases to 8231. The death toll rose to 61.
 The number of confirmed cases more than doubled in February, to 16861. The death toll rose to 109. 71 of the new cases could be linked to clusters inside the Majicavo prison.
 There were 2629 new cases in March, taking the total number of confirmed cases to 19490. The death toll rose to 162. Since the start of vaccination on 25 January, 15158 persons had received at least one inoculation and 5083 persons had received both inoculations.
 A study of the spread from March 2020 to March 2021 across Mayotte shows that up to 2000 cases could be linked to 185 identified infection clusters (99 in companies; 31 in associations; 23 in family settings; 14 in health or social establishments; 9 in schools or universities; 4 in connection with events; 3 in prison; one each in a military regiment and one on board an aircraft).

April to June 2021
 There were 604 new cases in April, taking the total number of confirmed cases to 20094. The death toll rose to 170.
 There were at least 193 new cases in May, taking the total number of cases to at least 20287. The reported number of cases was 19347. The death toll rose to 173. By the end of May, 44947 vaccine doses had been administered and 16938 persons had been fully vaccinated.
 There were at least 78 new cases in June, taking the total number of cases to at least 20365. The reported number of cases was 19425. The death toll rose to 174. By the end of the month, 72097 vaccine doses had been administered and 30535 persons had been fully vaccinated.

July to September 2021
 There were at least 78 new cases in July, taking the total number of cases to at least 20443. The reported number of cases was 19503. The death toll remained unchanged.
 There were at least 324 new cases in August, bringing the total number of cases to at least 20767. The reported number of cases was 19827. The death toll rose to 175.
 There were at least 494 new cases in September, bringing the total number of cases to at least 21261. The reported number of cases was 20306. The death toll rose to 179.

October to December 2021
 There were at least 281 new cases in October, bringing the total number of cases to at least 21542. The reported number of cases was 20587. The death toll rose to 185. Of Mayotte's inhabitants aged 15 years or more, 71% were found to have antibodies to COVID-19.
 There were at least 386 new cases in November, bringing the total number of cases to at least 21928. The reported number of cases was 20973. The death toll remained unchanged.
 There were at least 1759 new cases in December, bringing the total number of cases to at least 23687. The reported number of cases was 22732. The death toll remained unchanged.

January to March 2022
 There were at least 13704 new cases in January, bringing the total number of cases to at least 37391. The reported number of cases was 36436. The death toll rose to 187.
 There were at least 1267 new cases in February, bringing the total number of cases to at least 38658. The reported number of cases was 36703. The death toll remained unchanged.
 There were at least 188 new cases in March, bringing the total number of cases to at least 38846. The reported number of cases was 36891. The death toll remained unchanged.

April to June 2022
 There were at least 472 new cases in April, bringing the total number of cases to at least 39318. The reported number of cases was 37363. The death toll remained unchanged.
 There were at least 307 new cases in May, bringing the total number of cases to at least 39625. The reported number of cases was 37670. The death toll remained unchanged.

July to December 2022
 The reported number of cases by the end of July was 39392. The death toll remained unchanged.
 The reported number of cases by the end of August was 40129. The death toll remained unchanged.
 The reported number of cases by the end of September was 40261. The death toll remained unchanged.
 The reported number of cases by the end of October was 40320. The death toll remained unchanged.
 The reported number of cases by the end of November was 41802. The death toll remained unchanged.
 The reported number of cases by the end of December was 41993. The death toll remained unchanged.

Preventive measures
 15 March 2020 - All schools are closed.
 15 March 2020 - Social distancing must be observed. All non-essential businesses must close.
 18 March 2020 - People entering Mayotte must self isolate for 14 days.
 20 March 2020 - Access to beaches, coves and (uninhabited) islands is prohibited.
 25 March 2020 - A curfew was instituted between 20:00 and 05:00. Gathering with more than two people are banned. Traffic restrictions apply throughout the island.
 22 April 2020 - Farmers' markets are reopened in Coconi, Chirongui, and Kaweni. On 3 May, a market opened in Sada.

Statistics
Chronology of the number of active cases

Recoveries are no longer listed as of 21 August 2020

Source: Point de situation at mayotte.gouv.fr

See also 
 COVID-19 pandemic in Africa
 COVID-19 pandemic by country and territory
 COVID-19 pandemic in the Comoros
 COVID-19 pandemic in Réunion

References

External links
 Official website

Mayotte
Mayotte
2020 in Mayotte
2021 in Mayotte
2022 in Mayotte
Disease outbreaks in Mayotte